Sheffield United Football Club Youth Academy are the youth team of Sheffield United. The Under-18 and Under-23 teams play in Professional Development League 2.

The Academy is currently run by Jack Lester while Derek Geary coaches the U18s side. Sheffield United's youth system was given Academy status in December 2002.  In July 2017 the academy was recognised, in a study conducted by Press Association Sport, for having the 7th best academy for minutes played in the 2016–17 Premier League. In between Arsenal and Chelsea they placed by far the highest for a club outside the top-flight.

The team plays at the Shirecliffe Ground at Firshill Crescent.

Current squad
Updated 26 August 2021

Out on loan

List of Academy managers

Notable Academy Graduates
The Academy has produced England internationals such as Phil Jagielka, Kyle Walker and Harry Maguire as well as many players who have gone on to have careers in professional football, whether at Sheffield United or at other clubs. Current Sheffield United players are highlighted in green.

Honours
 FA Youth Cup: 2011 – Runners-up
 Professional U18 Development League 2: 2016–17 – Champions

Notes

References
Sheffield United Academy Official Page
Academy profiles from October 2010

Academy
Sport in Sheffield
Football academies in England